Axel Honneth (born 18 July 1949) is a German philosopher who is the Professor for Social Philosophy at Goethe University Frankfurt and the Jack B. Weinstein Professor of the Humanities in the department of philosophy at Columbia University. He was also director of the Institut für Sozialforschung (Institute for Social Research) in Frankfurt am Main, Germany between 2001 and 2018.

Biography
Honneth was born in Essen, West Germany on 18 July 1949, studied in Bonn, Bochum, Berlin and Munich (under Jürgen Habermas), and taught at the Free University of Berlin and the New School before moving to the Johann Wolfgang Goethe-University of Frankfurt in 1996. He also held the Spinoza Chair of Philosophy at the University of Amsterdam in 1999. Between 2001 and 2018 he was director of the Institute for Social Research, originally home to the so-called Frankfurt School, at the University of Frankfurt. Since 2011, he is also Jack B. Weinstein Professor of the Humanities at the department of philosophy at Columbia University in the City of New York.

Research
Honneth's work focuses on social-political and moral philosophy, especially relations of power, recognition, and respect. One of his core arguments is for the priority of intersubjective relationships of recognition in understanding social relations. This includes non- and mis-recognition as a basis of social and interpersonal conflict. For instance, grievances regarding the distribution of goods in society are ultimately struggles for recognition justice.

His first main work The Critique of Power: Reflective Stages in a Critical Social Theory explores the affinities between the Frankfurt School and Michel Foucault. In his second main work The Struggle for Recognition: Moral Grammar of Social Conflicts, the recognition concept is derived mainly from G. W. F. Hegel's early social philosophical works, but is supplemented by George Herbert Mead's social psychology, Jürgen Habermas' communicative ethics, and Donald Winnicott's object relations theory. Honneth's critical adaptation of these is the basis of his critical social theory, which attempts to remedy the deficits of previous approaches. In 2003, Honneth co-authored Recognition or Redistribution? with the feminist philosopher Nancy Fraser, who criticizes the priority of ethical categories such as recognition over structural social-political categories such as redistribution in Honneth's thought. His recent work Reification reformulates this key "Western Marxist" concept in terms of intersubjective relations of recognition and power. For Honneth, all forms of reification are due to intersubjectively based pathologies rather than the structural character of social systems such as capitalism as argued by Karl Marx and György Lukács.

In The Idea of Socialism, Honneth calls for a revision of socialist theory in order to make it relevant for the 21st century, based on a criticism of the socialist theory of historical materialism, ignorance of political rights and social differentiation in modern societies, and overemphasis on the working class as a revolutionary subject. In order to fully realize the three principles of the French revolution, Honneth suggests three revisions: Replacing economic determinism with historical experimentation inspired by John Dewey, expanding social freedom – mutual dependence and cooperation among members of society – to the other spheres of modern society (i.e. the political and the private), as well as addressing all citizens of the democratic sphere.

Works translated into English 
 Social Action and Human Nature, co-authored with Hans Joas (Cambridge University Press, 1988 [1980]).
 The Critique of Power: Reflective Stages in a Critical Social Theory (MIT Press, 1991 [1985]).
 The Fragmented World of the Social: Essays in Social and Political Philosophy (SUNY Press, 1995 [1990]). 
 The Struggle for Recognition: The Moral Grammar of Social Conflicts (Polity Press, 1995 [1992]).
 Redistribution or Recognition?: A Political-Philosophical Exchange, co-authored with Nancy Fraser (Verso, 2003).
 Reification: A Recognition-Theoretical View (Oxford University Press, 2007).
 Disrespect: The Normative Foundations of Critical Theory (Polity Press, 2007 [2000]).
 Pathologies of Reason: On the Legacy of Critical Theory (2009).
 The Pathologies of Individual Freedom: Hegel's Social Theory (2010).
 The I in We: Studies in the Theory of Recognition (2012).
 Freedom's Right (2014).
 The Idea of Socialism (2016).

See also 

 Critical theory
 Recognition (sociology)
 Social exclusion
 Charles Taylor (philosopher)

References

Further reading
Bert van den Brink and David Owen, Recognition and Power: Axel Honneth and the Tradition of Critical Social Theory (Cambridge University Press, 2007).
Deranty, Jean-Philippe, Beyond Communication: A Critical Study of Axel Honneth's Social Philosophy (Brill, 2009).
Iser, Matthias, Empörung und Fortschritt. Grundlagen einer Kritischen Theorie der Gesellschaft (Campus, 2008).
Schmidt-am-Busch, Hans-Christoph and Zurn, Christopher (eds), The Philosophy of Recognition. Historical and Contemporary Perspectives (Lexington Books, 2009)
Thompson, Simon, The Political Theory of Recognition. A Critical Introduction (Polity, 2006).
Huttunen, Rauno, Habermas, Honneth and Education (Lambert Academic Publishing 2009).

External links

 Tanner Lecture on Reification, 2005
 2006 Program of Research: Paradoxes of Capitalist Modernization
 Joel Anderson's Introduction to The Struggle for Recognition.
 Honneth in London Axel Honneth in conversation with Peter Dews, 2007
 Homepages of Axel Honneth at the University of Frankfurt  and the Institute for Social Research.
 2007 Talks by Honneth 
 "Patterns of Intersubjective Recognition: Love, Rights, and Solidarity" by Honneth
 "Social Criticism in the Age of the Normalized Intellectual"
 Chapter 1, The Pathologies of Individual Freedom: Hegel's Social Theory (2010)
 Recognition Forum (Research on recognition theory, bibliographies, theses, events, forum)
 Interview with Axel Honneth, Barcelona Metropolis, num. 78, Spring, 2010.
 Interview with Honneth for the Platypus Review 59 (September, 2013)
 Publications by Axel Honneth in WorldCat

1949 births
20th-century essayists
20th-century German male writers
20th-century German non-fiction writers
20th-century German philosophers
21st-century essayists
21st-century German male writers
21st-century German non-fiction writers
21st-century German philosophers
Columbia University faculty
Continental philosophers
Critical theorists
Frankfurt School
Academic staff of the Free University of Berlin
German ethicists
German male essayists
German male non-fiction writers
German political philosophers
German sociologists
Academic staff of Goethe University Frankfurt
Living people
The New School faculty
Philosophers of culture
Philosophers of economics
Philosophers of history
Philosophers of social science
Philosophy academics
Philosophy writers
Social philosophers
University of Bonn alumni
Academic staff of the University of Konstanz
Writers about activism and social change
Writers from Essen